Richard Randolph "Randy" Olson is a marine biologist-turned-filmmaker who earned his Ph.D. in Biology from Harvard University (1984) and became a tenured professor of marine biology at the University of New Hampshire (1992) before changing careers by moving to Hollywood and entering film school at the University of Southern California.

He has written and directed a number of short films and feature documentaries which have premiered at film festivals such as Tribeca Film Festival and Telluride Film Festival. Most of his films draw on his science background, involve humor, and address major science issues such as the decline of the world's oceans, the controversy around the teaching of evolution versus intelligent design, and the attacks on global warming science.

Early life
Olson was born in Heidelberg, Germany, the son of Colonel John Eric Olson, West Point graduate (class of 1939). When he was 4 years old his family moved to Hawaii, where they lived for four years. Olson credits his time near the ocean in these years with his eventual career as a marine biologist. Olson's family subsequently moved to Virginia, then Kansas City, Kansas where he attended high school and began college at the University of Kansas.

Science career
After dropping out of the University of Kansas, he worked on an oceanographic project in Puerto Rico. Olson then returned to college at the University of Washington. There he got involved in marine biological research along the outer coast of the Olympic Peninsula of Washington, spent a semester at Friday Harbor Marine Laboratory, and graduated with a B.A. in Zoology.

He was accepted to Harvard University's Ph.D. program in biology. His dissertation research took him to Australia in the early 1980s studying coral reef ecology on the Great Barrier Reef. While conducting his research, he spent an entire year living on Lizard Island on the northern end of the Great Barrier Reef. He earned his Ph.D. in evolutionary biology from Harvard in 1984.

He returned to Townsville, Australia as a postdoctoral fellow at the Australian Institute of Marine Science, working for the Australian government studying the problem of the crown-of-thorns starfish and its destructive effect on the Great Barrier Reef. In 1985 he visited the U.S. research station in Antarctica at McMurdo Sound for his research on starfish reproduction which involved scuba dives beneath the Antarctic ice sheet.

In 1988 Olson was appointed a professor in the Zoology Department at the University of New Hampshire. His research on the dispersal of larvae of marine organisms on coral reefs has been described as "some of the best work in that field".
During his time at UNH Olson also produced several short films on marine life, such as Barnacles Tell No Lies, Lobstahs, and Salt of the Earth. Salt of the Earth was shown on a local PBS station. After being awarded tenure in 1994, Olson took a leave of absence to attend film school, eventually resigning his scientific position.

Film career
Olson earned his M.F.A. from the USC School of Cinematic Arts in 1997. For his student film he wrote and directed the twenty-minute musical comedy short film, His student film, You Ruined My Career, premiered at the 1996 Telluride Film Festival in the "Filmmakers of Tomorrow" showcase.

In 2002, Olson and coral reef ecologist Jeremy Jackson of Scripps Institution of Oceanography, created a 7-minute short film, Rediagnosing the Oceans.

Olson directed the feature documentary, Flock of Dodos, which premiered at the 2006 Tribeca Film Festival. The film focused on the “ongoing debate between evolutionary biologists and those who espouse intelligent design.”

In 2008 Olson wrote and directed the mockumentary feature film, Sizzle, which “confronts global warming with humor.”

Olson partnered in 2019 with surf photographer Brian Bielmann and filmmaker Brent Storm to help produce the documentary feature White Rhino. The film documents the three massive swells that hit Fiji and Tahiti in 2011-12.

Olson has been criticized for potentially "dumbing down" serious science issues. His response is that his critics fail to grasp the difference between "dumbing down" and concision.

Books
Olson has authored the following books and articles:

References

External links
 Profile
 

Visual anthropologists
Harvard University alumni
American anthropologists
Living people
USC School of Cinematic Arts alumni
Year of birth missing (living people)